Plowden is a hamlet in the parish of Lydbury North, Shropshire, England. It is in the valley of the River Onny and lies 3 miles east of Bishop's Castle. Plowden was one of the stations on the Bishops Castle Railway, which closed in 1935.

Plowden Hall is a grade II* listed building, being a timber-framed building dating in part from about 1300, and is described in the novel John Inglesant by Joseph Henry Shorthouse, who drew the place as Lydiard. Its owners, the Plowden family, remained Roman Catholics after the Reformation and there is a Roman Catholic church of St Walburga in Plowden.  When Edwin Plowden was awarded a life peerage in 1959 he took the title of Baron Plowden of Plowden in the county of Salop. GWR Hall class  locomotive 4956 was named after the hall.

See also
Listed buildings in Lydbury North

References

Villages in Shropshire